Joseph Hiam Levy (1838 – 1913) was an English author and economist. He was educated at the City of London School and joined the Civil Service. He later became a lecturer in economics at Birkbeck College and an important figure in the Personal Rights Association.

Levy also wrote an introduction to the English translation of Yves Guyot's 1893 work, The Tyranny of Socialism.

Levy was an anti-vaccinationist as he believed it violated personal rights. He described compulsory vaccination as a "gross and cruel invasion of personal liberty". Levy's anti-vaccination book, The Bird that Laid the Vaccination Egg, published in 1892 was heavily criticized in medical journals as non-scientific.

Publications
 A Symposium on Value. Edited by J. H. Levy, and consisting of papers by E. B. Bax, W. Donisthorpe   1895
 The Bird that Laid the Vaccination Egg: An Excursus on Scientific Authority. 1892
 State Vaccination: With Special Reference to Some Principles of Ancient Judaism. 1897
 Book-Plate and Verses. (The Lighthouse. Reprinted from the “Westminster Review.”). 1910
 The Economics of Labour Remuneration. A lecture.
 The Enfranchisement of Women: A Speech, etc. 1892
 The Fall of Man. (Verses with notes. Reprinted from the Westminster Review 1899)
 The Fiscal Question in Great Britain. Introduced by J. H. Levy. 1904
 Freedom the Fundamental Condition of Morality. A paper read at the Conference of the British, Con 1896
 The God of Israel. A paper read before the International Positivist Congress at Naples, 27 April 1908
 Individualism and the Land Question: A Discussion. 1912
 The Psychology of Pasteurism. A paper planned to be read at Cambridge at the end of 1913 but not delivered due to the author's death.

References

External links
 
 
 

1838 births
1913 deaths
19th-century English male writers
20th-century English male writers
Academics of Birkbeck, University of London
British anti-vaccination activists
English activists
English economists
People educated at the City of London School